Squalius cii is a species of freshwater fish in the family Cyprinidae. It is also known as the Marmara chub. The species is endemic to Turkey.

References

Fish described in 1857
Squalius